The Armada Road Multi-Family District is a U.S. historic district in Venice, Florida. On December 18, 1989, it was added to the U.S. National Register of Historic Places.

Gallery

References

External links
 Sarasota County listings at National Register of Historic Places

National Register of Historic Places in Sarasota County, Florida
Historic districts on the National Register of Historic Places in Florida